Laurent Tillie (born 1 December 1963) is a French professional volleyball coach and former player. He was a member of the France national team from 1982 to 1995, and a participant in the Olympic Games (Seoul 1988, Barcelona 1992). He currently serves as head coach for the Japanese team, Panasonic Panthers.

Personal life
Tillie earned a Bachelor of Science in Movement and Education in 1984, as well as a Diploma of Physiotherapy and Kinesiology in 1991, from the University of Nice. Tillie is a father of three: Kevin, Kim, and Killian, as well as the husband to the former Dutch national team captain, Caroline Keulen. Kim graduated from the University of Utah where he played for the Utah Utes men's basketball team. He went on to make the Men’s French National team, winning a bronze medal at the 2014 World Cup. Kevin attended the University of California, Irvine, where he became a 2-time NCAA Volleyball Champion with the UC Irvine Anteaters men's volleyball team, and is currently a member of the France men’s national team. The youngest, Killian, played for the Gonzaga Bulldogs men's basketball team at Gonzaga University.He is currently playing for the Memphis Grizzlies of the NBA. Killian was also in the France national team developmental system, winning a gold medal with France at the 2014 FIBA Europe Under-16 Championship and being named MVP of that competition.

Career

As a player
Tillie was part of the France men's national volleyball team between 1982 and 1995, playing in total 407 international matches. He served as team captain from 1991 to 1992. France won a bronze medal at the 1985 European Championship and a silver medal two years later. His team qualified for World Championships in 1982, 1986, and 1990 and represented their country at the 1988 Summer Olympics in Seoul and 1992 Summer Olympics in Barcelona. Tillie played professionally for AS Cannes, Paris, Nice and Falconara in Italy.

As a coach
After his playing career Tillie went into volleyball coaching, returning to Cannes in 2001. His team became French champions in 2005, and French Cup winner in 2007. In 2005, Tillie assumed more responsibility serving as the head coach for the Czech Republic men's national volleyball team. He led this team to 9th place at the 2005 European Championship and qualification for the 2006 World Championships. He remained with AS Cannes until he accepted the position as the head coach of the France men's national volleyball team in July 2012. In 2013 and 2014 the French team finished 10th at World League and just a few months later, France finished 4th at the 2014 Men’s World Championship in Poland. He coached the French men's national volleyball team to the 2015 World League Championship in Rio. At the Tokyo 2020 Olympics he coached his team to the gold medal, defeating the ROC in five sets.

Honours

As a player
 CEV European Champions Cup
  1982/1983 – with AS Cannes
 CEV Challenge Cup
  1980/1981 – with AS Cannes
 National championships
 1980/1981  French Championship, with AS Cannes 
 1981/1982  French Championship, with AS Cannes 
 1982/1983  French Championship, with AS Cannes 
 1989/1990  French Championship, with AS Cannes 
 1990/1991  French Championship, with AS Cannes 
 1995/1996  French Championship, with Paris UC
 1996/1997  French Cup, with Paris UC 
 1996/1997  French Championship, with Paris UC
 1997/1998  French Championship, with Paris UC

As a coach
 National championships
 2004/2005  French Championship, with AS Cannes 
 2006/2007  French Cup, with AS Cannes

Individual awards
 2021: CEV – Coach of the Year

References

External links

 
 
 Player profile at LegaVolley.it   
 Coach/Player profile at Volleybox.net

1963 births
Living people
Volleyball players from Algiers
French sportspeople of Algerian descent
French men's volleyball players
French volleyball coaches
Olympic volleyball players of France
French Olympic coaches
Volleyball players at the 1988 Summer Olympics
Volleyball players at the 1992 Summer Olympics
French expatriate sportspeople in Italy
Expatriate volleyball players in Italy
French expatriate sportspeople in Japan
AS Cannes Volley-Ball players
Outside hitters